The 2011–12 Princeton Tigers women's hockey team represented Princeton University in the 2011–12 NCAA Division I women's ice hockey season. The Tigers are a member of the Eastern College Athletic Conference.

Offseason
September 22: Lee-J Mirasolo has joined the Tigers coaching staff as an assistant coach.

Recruiting

Regular season

Standings

Schedule

Awards and honors
Denna Laing, ECAC Player of the Week (Week of November 7, 2011)

References

Princeton
Princeton Tigers women's ice hockey seasons
Princeton Tigers
Princeton Tigers